Beargrass Creek State Nature Preserve is a  nature preserve located in Louisville, Kentucky's Poplar Level neighborhood, in roughly the central portion of the city. It is named for Beargrass Creek, the south fork of which passes along the northern side of the preserve. The preserve is adjacent to Louisville's Joe Creason Park and the Louisville Nature Center. It is owned by the Office of Kentucky Nature Preserves and the LNC assists with management.

The preserve includes  of walking trails, which cross wetlands and a ridge top. There are also 180 species of trees, shrubs and wildflowers. It is managed by the Louisville Nature Center, which is located on the west side of the preserve in a building which opened in 1997. The center claims it is "one of the largest inner-city nature preserves" in the United States. The preserve and nature center run on about a $90,000 annual budget, and in May 2007 reported about $100,000 in operational debt.

In 1982, the State Nature Preserves Commission purchased a  wooded tract that became the preserve. It was a part of the Collings estate (which became Joe Creason Park) that had been acquired by the Archdiocese of Louisville in 1960.

Additional Trail Information 
As well as the walkable trails, there is a boardwalk that leads to a platform where individuals can listen in to an educational podcast on the preserve. Beargrass Creek trails offer a diverse amount of plants and wildlife for people to explore. These trails give hikers the chance to explore and discover said local flora and fauna, with many wildlife viewing opportunities available as well. Native plants of Beargrass Creek State Nature Preserve include Yellowwood (Cladrastis kentukea), Kentucky Coffeetree (Gymnocladus dioicus) for trees; Spicebush (Lindera benzoin), and Wild Hydrangea (Hydrangea arborescens) for shrubs; Purple Coneflower (Echinacea purpurea), and Shrub Yellowroot (Xanthorhiza simplicissima) for wildflowers. With plants there are bound to have native wildlife to accompany them with over 150 species of documented birds, which are detailed in an article for Wildlife Trails in Kentucky, and 30 recorded butterfly species.

Accessing Beargrass Creek State Nature Preserve 
Starting from Freys Hill Road or Westport Road, take I-265 to I-64 and head to exit 19. Your next step involves taking I-264 to Newburg Road, taking exit 15.

See also
 List of attractions and events in the Louisville metropolitan area

References

External links
Office of Kentucky Nature Preserves - Beargrass Creek State Nature Preserve page
Trail Map
Louisville Nature Center

Nature reserves in Kentucky
Parks in Louisville, Kentucky
Protected areas established in 1982
Nature centers in Kentucky
1982 establishments in Kentucky